Juan Carlos Domínguez Domínguez (born 13 April 1971 in Íscar, Spain) is a former professional road racing cyclist. He was a professional rider from 1995 to 2006.

In the 2006 Eneco Tour of Benelux he had a hematocrit above 50 before the start of stage 5 and he was suspended for 15 days.

His daughter, Estela, was killed in a collision with a lorry at a lorry at Villares de la Reina in February 2023 at the age of 19, while training for her first year as a professional with the Sopela team.

Major results

1994
1st GP Capodarco
1996
3rd Overall Vuelta a Aragón
7th Time trial, UCI Road World Championships
9th Overall Tour of the Basque Country
9th Subida al Naranco
1997
1st  Overall Vuelta a Murcia
1st Mountains classification
1st Stage 5 (ITT)
1st  Overall Setmana Catalana de Ciclisme
1st Stage 5b (ITT)
1st  Overall Volta a la Comunitat Valenciana
4th Overall Tour of Galicia
5th Overall Vuelta a Aragón
10th Time trial, UCI Road World Championships
1998
1st  Overall Clásica de Alcobendas
2nd Overall Vuelta a La Rioja
1st Stage 3
2nd Time trial, National Road Championships
1999
1st  Overall Vuelta a Aragón
1st Stage 3
1st  Overall Vuelta a La Rioja
1st Stage 3
1st  Overall Vuelta a Asturias
1st Points classification
1st  Overall Clásica de Alcobendas
5th Overall Setmana Catalana de Ciclisme
9th Overall Tour of the Basque Country
2000
2nd Overall Volta a la Comunitat Valenciana
2nd Overall Critérium International
3rd Overall Tirreno-Adriatico
7th Overall Tour of the Basque Country
2001
1st  Overall Vuelta a Asturias
1st Points classification
1st Stage 6b
1st  Overall Vuelta a Aragón
1st Stage 3
1st  Overall Euskal Bizikleta
4th Overall Vuelta a La Rioja
5th Overall Tour of the Basque Country
5th Overall Critérium International
7th Overall Vuelta a Murcia
7th Circuito de Getxo
2002
1st Prologue Giro d'Italia
1st Stage 2b Setmana Catalana de Ciclisme (ITT)
2003
2nd Overall Tour de Picardie
1st Stage 3b
5th Overall Vuelta a Murcia
6th Overall Vuelta a Aragón
7th Overall Critérium International
2004
1st  Overall Vuelta a Andalucía
1st Stage 3
6th Overall Vuelta a Burgos
2005
1st  Overall Vuelta a Burgos
1st Stage 4
2006
9th Overall Critérium International

References

External links

Spanish male cyclists
1971 births
Living people
Spanish Giro d'Italia stage winners
Sportspeople from the Province of Valladolid
Olympic cyclists of Spain
Cyclists at the 2000 Summer Olympics
Cyclists from Castile and León